The 2010 China League One is the seventh season since the establishment.

Teams
After 2009 season, Liaoning Whowin and Nanchang Bayi Hengyuan were promoted to Chinese Super League 2010 and Sichuan F.C. were relegated to China League Two 2010. They were replaced by Hunan Billows and Hubei Luyin which promoted from League Two 2009, Chengdu Blades and Guangzhou F.C. who relegated from Super League 2009. Beijing Baxy&Shengshi took over Beijing Hongdeng and take their position within the division.

Chengdu Blades and Guangzhou F.C., who finished in 7th and 9th place in Super League 2009, were relegated from the top flight for match-fixing scandals, while Qingdao Hailifeng, who finished in 10th place in League One 2009, were banned from all future national matches organized by the CFA for the same reason.

On 21 July 2010, Guangzhou Evergrande trounced Nanjing Yoyo 10-0 at Century Lotus Stadium, setting a new record in Chinese professional football league for biggest ever League win in the process.

On 25 September 2010, Guangzhou Evergrande and Chengdu Blades promoted to the Chinese Super League for the 2011 season after Hubei Luyin draw 1-1 with Shanghai Zobon. On 23 October, Nanjing Yoyo relegated to China League Two after a 5-0 home defeat to Guangzhou Evergrande.

League table

Results

Top scorers
Updated to games played on 30 October 2010.

Notes

References

External links
Official site 
League One at Sina.com 

China League One seasons
2
China
China